Inner Ring Road, also known as Inner Ring Elevated Road, is an elevated expressway loop in the city of Shanghai. It was the first ring road around the city of Shanghai. The Puxi section of the road was completely grade-separated and complete in 1994, while the Pudong section of the road was completely grade-separated in 2009. Before the grade separation in Pudong, the road ran at street level, with traffic lights at intersections.

The Inner Ring Road crosses the Huangpu River twice, using the Yangpu and Nanpu bridges.

Exit list

See also
 S20 Outer Ring Expressway: Another ring road in Shanghai

References 

Ring roads in China
Expressways in Shanghai